Fiesta Songs is a 2003 album by Señor Coconut Y Su Conjunto (Uwe Schmidt). It is an album of covers done in a Latin American style.

Like the previous album, this is a tribute album. It includes covers of Deep Purple, The Doors, Michael Jackson, Sade, and Jean Michel Jarre.

Track listing
 "Smoke on the Water" [Cha-Cha-Cha] – 4:49
 "Negra Mi Cha Cha Cha"  [Cha-Cha-Cha] – 3:22
 "Riders on the Storm"  [Merengue] – 5:05
 "Smooth Operator"  [Mambo Cha-Cha-Cha] – 4:04
 "El Rey de las Galletas"  [Guaguanco] – 3:27
 "Oxygène, Pt. 2"  [Mambo Cha-Cha-Cha] – 3:36
 "Blue Eyes"  [Bolero]  – 3:57
 "Las Marcas de Machin"  [Cha-Cha-Cha] – 3:02
 "Beat It"  [Merengue]  – 3:55
 "Electrolatino"  [Mambo Cha-Cha-Cha] – 4:06
 untitled [Humo en el Agua (Spanish version of "Smoke on the Water")] – 4:46

Personnel
Lars Vissing - Trumpet, Flugelhorn
Cecilia Aguayo	- Voices
August Engkilde - Bass (Upright), Horn Arrangements, Score
Thomas Hass - Sax (Baritone), Sax (Tenor)
Argenis Brito - Percussion, Vocals
Linger Decoree - Sampling, Design, Typography
Morten Gronvad - Percussion, Vibraphone
Peter Kibsgaard - Percussion
Klaus Löhr - Trombone, Trombone (Bass)
Carsten Skov - Marimba

2003 albums
Covers albums
Uwe Schmidt albums
Emperor Norton Records albums